Nadia Vigliano (born June 24, 1977 at Creil) is a French athlete, who specialises in the javelin.

Biography  
She won four  French javelin championship titles in 2007, 2008, 2009 and 2011.

Her personal best, thrown on 8 June 2008 at Draguignan, is  57.31 metres.

Prize list  
 French Championships in Athletics:  
 winner in the javelin 2007,  2008,  2009 and 2011

Records

Notes and references

External links  
 

1977 births
Living people
French female javelin throwers